The canton of Saint-Loup-sur-Semouse is an administrative division of the Haute-Saône department, northeastern France. Its borders were modified at the French canton reorganisation which came into effect in March 2015. Its seat is in Saint-Loup-sur-Semouse.

It consists of the following communes:
 
Abelcourt
Aillevillers-et-Lyaumont
Ainvelle
Briaucourt
Conflans-sur-Lanterne
Corbenay
Éhuns
Fleurey-lès-Saint-Loup
Fontaine-lès-Luxeuil
Fougerolles-Saint-Valbert (partly)
Francalmont
Hautevelle
Magnoncourt
Mailleroncourt-Charette
Meurcourt
Neurey-en-Vaux
Sainte-Marie-en-Chaux
Saint-Loup-sur-Semouse
La Vaivre
Velorcey
La Villedieu-en-Fontenette
Villers-lès-Luxeuil
Visoncourt

References

Cantons of Haute-Saône